Port Canaveral is a cruise, cargo, and naval port in Brevard County, Florida, United States. The port is the world's busiest cruise port, with over 4 million passengers passing through during their 2022 financial year. Over 5.4 million tonnes of bulk cargo moves through each year.

Primary cargoes include slag, salt, vehicles, containers, petroleum, heavy equipment, lumber, and aggregate. The port has conveyors and hoppers for loading products directly into trucks and facilities for bulk-cargo containers.

The port exports fresh citrus; bulk-frozen citrus juice stored in one of the largest freezer warehouses in the state; cement; and building materials. The port receives lumber, salt for water-softening, automobiles, and steel sheet and plate. It transships items for land, sea, air, and space.

On average, ten ships enter the port each day. This includes ships from cruise lines such as Carnival, Disney, Royal Caribbean, Norwegian, and more.

Governing authority
The Canaveral Port Authority was established in 1953 by the State Legislature and consists of the Board of Commissioners and the Executive Management Team. The Board sets policies such as fiscal, regulatory, and operations, while the executives are responsible for administrative and operational duties. In October 2015 the board voted unanimously to terminate embattled CEO John Walsh. Walsh clashed with residents over a controversial plan to build a cargo railway through a federally managed wildlife refuge. Walsh drew community outrage after calling opponents of his plan "Luddites" and "dogs chasing moving cars." Walsh lied about documentation from the United States Air Force, relating to building the Canaveral Rail through the Cape Canaveral Air Force Station.

The five Commissioners of the Board are elected from the surrounding area by popular vote. They must live in specific areas but are elected by voters in all five districts.  The races are partisan.
 District 1 (Kennedy Space Center / Titusville) - Jerry Allender
 District 2 (Area between Titusville and Cocoa and west of the US 1) - Micah Loyd
 District 3 (Cocoa / Rockledge) - Wayne Justice
 District 4 (East of the US 1 and Cape Canaveral) - Bob Harvey
 District 5 (Port Canaveral / Cocoa Beach) - Robyn Hattaway

 Salary is $10,083.72 annually.

The Executive Management Team is headed by the Chief Executive Officer (CEO).

In 2013, there were 233 staff members, 162 full-time, 71 part-time.

In FY 2017, the Canaveral Port Authority had 223 full-time equivalent employees.

History
A columnist grouped the history of the actual port into four eras, roughly paralleling the terms of the several directors: 1) initial construction and operation of the port with no clearcut separation of governance and management 1947–2004, 2) expansion of port facilities. Port becomes second in cruise business worldwide 2004–2013, 3) political friction between governance and management 2013–2016, 4) modern era 2016–present.

Artesia
A post office in the area was built and listed in the US Post Office application as Artesia. and retained this name from 1893–1954; and then went into service for Port Canaveral from
1954–1962.

Dredging a port

The idea of developing a port at this location was first conceived in the 1880s. The port was dredged between 1951 and 1955. Dedication occurred November 4, 1953, with the United States Navy destroyer escort  participating. Florida U.S. Senator Spessard Holland was the keynote speaker.

Noah Butt, a former speaker of the Florida House of Representatives, was the first Chairman of the Canaveral Port Authority. The first port manager, George King, was announced in 1954. Commercial fishing had already begun at the port, and in the next year commercial shipping began, with a load of bagged cement delivered by the SS MormacSpruce. In 1955, the Tropicana Corporation began building a refrigerated warehouse for storing orange juice, a local agricultural product, prior to shipping.

Port

The ship was American owned, with registration from Panama. The ship burned at sea between Miami and Nassau, Bahamas in 1965, and cruise traffic was limited until the 1980s.

In 1965, a lock was dedicated at the port, as part of the Canaveral Barge Canal. The Canaveral Lock is still in operation and is maintained by the United States Army Corps of Engineers. The focus of the port throughout the 1960s and 1970s remained commercial fishing and shipping, with three  cargo piers built on the north side of the Port in 1976, and a succession of warehouses built in the port area. 

Port Canaveral has played a role in support of NASA projects out of nearby Kennedy Space Center. During the Apollo program, segments of the Saturn V rocket transited through the port and lock.  Most recently, the external fuel tanks of the Space Shuttle were floated into Port Canaveral for each mission, and the solid rocket boosters towed back through Port Canaveral upon retrieval from the Atlantic Ocean after each launch.  NASA contributed $250,000 for improvements in the lock in 1965.

In 1990, Morton Salt began operations at the port. In 2018, it imported salt from the Bahamas and produced  of pool, water softener, sea salt, and agricultural salts.

Prior to its disestablishment in 2000, Premier Cruise Line was headquartered in Cape Canaveral.

In 2008, Sterling Casino Lines ceased doing business at the port.  A week later, the Las Vegas Casino Line began operating gambling cruises. On March 25, 2009, the Las Vegas Casino Line filed for bankruptcy, joining the Sterling Casino on the list of failed 'Casino Lines' to operate out of Port Canaveral.

In 2009, a commissioner resigned and the Florida Department of Law Enforcement announced that it was conducting an investigation into possible corruption at the port.

In 2009, the last cruise company to offer gambling, SunCruz Casinos, filed for Chapter 7 bankruptcy (liquidation). The companies failed due to competition from land-based gambling activities in Seminole Casinos, and Greyhound racing venues. Gambling liners hit a high on 1.0 million passengers in 2004, before starting to decline. Casino operations generated about $5–$6 million annually for the port.

In the 2010s, SpaceX began using the port for their autonomous spaceport drone ships (ASDS). In April 2016, the ASDS  returned the first Falcon 9 booster recovered at sea to Port Canaveral.

Seaport Canaveral was completed in 2010. Vitol SA built a fuel-tank depot with a pipeline to Orlando International Airport. The ,  storage depot cost $150 million.

Cruise Terminal 6 opened in mid-2012, for Carnival Dream, Carnival Sensation, and other Carnival ships.

A recent addition to the port is the seven-story Exploration Tower, which offers tourists almost  of exhibit space, interactive displays, two observation decks – one inside and one outside – a 72-seat auditorium, event rooms, and a café and gift shop.

Canaveral Pilots 
In the year 1968 the Canaveral Pilots Association was founded by pilots Frederick Dezendorf and Frederick Jonassen. The Canaveral Pilots Association is the local association of state licensed harbor pilots who board all inbound and outbound foreign-flagged ocean-going ships, as well as select U.S. flagged vessels who call on the port. While on board the ships, the pilot take conn and direct the movement of the vessels when navigating the channels and basins of Port Canaveral.  The association currently owns two single screw, aluminum hull pilot boats that are used to pick up and drop off pilots from a vessel.  As of September 2022, there is currently eight state licensed pilots (Unit K, M, N, O, P, Q, R) at the port with two deputy pilot (Unit S, T). In Port Canaveral the pilot boarding station for most inbound vessels is at sea-buoys 3/4.

Cruise traffic
Carnival, Disney, Norwegian and Royal Caribbean International are some of the cruise lines which dock at one of the five cruise terminals.  The port hosted 109,175 multi-day cruise passengers in October 2008.  There was a high of 307,005 passengers in April 2009. This fell to a seasonal low of 221,557 in October. With the loss of daily gambling ship cruises, port authorities do not expect this high to be exceeded for some time. There were 2.8 million passengers in 2010.

In the early 1980s, a new port director, Charles Rowland, shifted the focus towards developing the port to a Cruise port. In 1982, a  warehouse on the north side of the port was converted into Cruise Terminal 1. The , a 10,427-ton ship, was the first cruise ship to home-port at Port Canaveral. Early cruises were simple day cruises out into the ocean and back. The Port then purchased two former Bicentennial exhibit halls from NASA in 1983 and they became Terminals 2 and 3 in 1983. The first year-round 3- and 4-day cruises to the Bahamas began. A fourth cruise terminal was built in 1986. Expansion into the Western Turning Basin began with the construction of Terminal 5. The  started sailing from there at that time becoming the first mega-ship to call the Port home.

In December 2014, Port Canaveral and Royal Caribbean International opened Terminal 1, a new terminal building built to handle the  ships.

Ships based out of Port Canaveral 

The following ships are home-ported at Port Canaveral:
 Mardi Gras
 Carnival Freedom
 Carnival Liberty
 Carnival Magic
 Disney Fantasy
 Disney Wish
 Norwegian Escape
 Mariner of the Seas
 Independence of the Seas
 Jewel of the Seas
 MSC Meraviglia
 Wonder of the Seas

Ships that visit Port Canaveral 
 Adventure of the Seas
 AIDAvita
 Anthem of the Seas
 Carnival Pride
 Enchantment of the Seas 
 Grandeur of the Seas
 Mein Schiff 6
 MSC Divina
 Norwegian Bliss
 Norwegian Breakaway
 Norwegian Gem*
 Oasis of the Seas

Future ships based out of Port Canaveral 
 Norwegian Prima (November 2022)

US Navy

The Naval Ordnance Test Unit operates the naval port. They have 100 sailors and 70 subcontractors.

In 2011, the support ship  was homeported at the port.

The Trident Turning Basin supports Navy ballistic missile submarines.

Statistics
In 2011, about 75 percent of cargo was fuel. Overall tonnage rose  40 percent ahead of 2010.

In fiscal year 2007-2008, there was a 44.5% drop in cargo in October and November compared with the preceding year. Multi-day cruise passengers dropped 14.4%, and gambling passengers dropped 23.7%. Cargo slowdown was attributed to a slowdown in construction in Florida due to the weakened housing market. In 2008, cruise passengers held fairly steady at about 200,000 per month for the year.

Carnival has 140 employees resident at the port.

SeaFest
The SeaFest seafood festival was first held in 1983. The celebration occurred over three days in early spring, and was co-hosted by the Cocoa Beach Area Chamber of Commerce and the Canaveral Port Authority. It featured live music, local artists, and seafood. In 2006, because of security concerns and the site being needed for cargo, the festival was forced to move elsewhere and was renamed. In 2008 it tried to move back but was canceled.

Twenty-first century
These were used, cost $50,000 and required remodeling.

In FY 2017-2018, the port expected to gross $100 million, and net $3 million. About 60% of revenue cams from cruise lines. Cruise-related parking was 18%. About 22% was derived from cargo. Petroleum and related bottled products constituted 43% of cargo.

In 2017, the port planned to replace the small third terminal with a $150 million one, in 2019.

In 2018, the port announced a planned agreement with Carnival Cruise Line to accommodate Carnival's new  ship. This ship would use the now under construction Terminal 3 as its home-port.

Recreation
The Canaveral Port Authority owns and operates Jetty Park. In 2016, 325,000 people visited the park.

Impact
Ocean currents move sand along the coast in a natural process known as longshore drift.

To counteract this effect the Canaveral Harbor Federal Sand Bypass Project transfers sand from the shoreline north of the harbor entrance to areas of shoreline south of the entrance. This plan is implemented through a partnership of Canaveral Port Authority, the U.S. Army Corps of Engineers (Jacksonville District), and the State of Florida and Brevard County.

References

External links 
 

 
 Canaveral Lock

 Port Canaveral Webcam

Geography of Brevard County, Florida
Canaveral, Port
State agencies of Florida 
Government of Florida
Transportation buildings and structures in Brevard County, Florida
Tourist attractions in Brevard County, Florida
1953 establishments in Florida